Goriče pri Famljah is a small village north of Famlje in the Municipality of Divača in the Littoral region of Slovenia.

Name
The name of the settlement was changed from Goriče to Goriče pri Famljah in 1955.

References

External links 

Goriče pri Famljah on Geopedia

Populated places in the Municipality of Divača